An equestrian statue of Mark Cubbon was unveiled at Bangalore, India on 16 March 1866. The statue is by Carlo Marochetti and was, eventually, placed within the premises of the Karnataka High Court but was moved to Cubbon Park, officially Sri Chamarajendra Park, in June 2020 to improve security around the High Court.

References

Buildings and structures in Bangalore
Equestrian statues in India
Monuments and memorials in India
Sculptures of men in India
Monuments and memorials removed during the George Floyd protests
Statues removed in 2020